The Asemapäällikönhovi (literally, Station Master's Court) building is a mixed-use complex located at Asemapäällikönkatu 3, in the Eastern Pasila (Itä-Pasila) area of the district of Pasila in Helsinki, Finland.

The building was designed by architect  in the Brutalist style, and completed in 1976. It has received acclaim for its bold architecture. In 2020 it was featured by the German Architecture Museum in the exhibition SOS Brutalism. It is also listed by the city of Helsinki on the official Helsinki tourism website myhelsinki.fi as an architectural attraction of historical significance. The building is also referenced on the tourism page for the district of Eastern Pasila. Emporis includes the building in its global database of "buildings of high public and economic value."

The building is owned by Osakeyhtiö Asemapäällikönhovi – a standard joint-stock company, rather than a housing joint-stock company (asunto-osakeyhtiö).

The top floor of the residential tower is dedicated to the following common facilities for residents:

 A 10 x 3 metre swimming pool, heated using district heating. The pool is open every morning to all residents for communal use as well as in the evenings for private use during each resident's own sauna time slot.
 Two saunas, each with dedicated showering and changing facilities and access to the pool. Each resident can book a weekly private sauna hour which includes private use of the pool.
 A gym with dedicated showering and changing facilities.
 A drying room (for drying large fabrics like sheets).
 Two roof decks.

The basement floors of the building include both heated and refrigerated storage units, one of both corresponding to each flat.

Television studio 
The building complex contains the former  TV-studios, later operated by Tuotantotalo Werne and currently operated by Streamteam Nordic. Today the studios are owned by telecom operator DNA who also owns other space in the building.

The studios were inaugurated in December 1976 by the Mayor of Helsinki, Teuvo Aura. In 1978 the facility began to produce the first subscription-based TV channel in Europe, called Viihde-kanava.

In 1982 the studio became the first in Europe to relay satellite broadcasts to a cable network.

Large satellite dishes were installed on the roof of the residential tower to facilitate these operations, and they remain a local landmark to this day.

In popular culture 

The distinct architecture of the complex has attracted international attention from photographers and filmmakers. At least the following works have been partially or wholly made on the property:

2021

 Music video: ISO VOIMAKAS KOMEE by WYK, Eevil Stöö, Pajafella, Justsesomali – filmed partly on the roof of the residential tower.
Music video: Heartless by Mauton – Filmed around the courtyard and the entrances to the residential tower.
Advertising campaign: Lähde Lenkille by SEK for HK – filmed around the building.

2020

 Music video: Veli mä vannon by Gettomasa – filmed around the property.
YLE short film Ero – filmed around the property, including in the courtyard, facing the office wing.
 Music video: Katon mitä tapahtuu by Armas – shots of the residential tower and the facade including the refrigeration heat exchangers used by the K-Market in the building.
 Music video: v!@%#mikko by Pyhimys – shots of the residential tower and the pilotis at its base.

2019

 Episode 7, season 2 of  – filmed around the property, including in a stairwell and lobby of the residential tower and in a flat there.
 Dplay.fi marketing campaign, published online and via digital, bus stop roll-signs around the city – featuring the heat exchanger facade as well as a facade facing Topparikuja.

2012

 Music video: HELSINKI - SHANGRI-LA by Paleface – filmed primarily in the space under Opastinsilta by the building's garage entrance. Also including shots of the loading dock entrance and K-Market heat exchangers.

Current tenants
The commercial tenants based in the building include:

 DNA Oyj (telecom operator)
Outrun Cafe
 K-Market Pasaati (grocery store)
 LT2 creative space (coworking space)
 Suora Oy (TV studio operator)
 Pasilan Pizzapalvelu (restaurant)
 Yi Jian Yuan (restaurant)
 Helsingin Varavarasto (self-storage facility)

References 

Buildings and structures in Helsinki
Pasila
Modernist architecture in Finland